The 2019 MFF Cup (2019 Холбооны Цом) is the 12th edition of the MFF Cup, the knockout football tournament in Mongolia.

Bractets

Round of 32
The draw for the round of 32 was held on 17 May 2019.

Matches played between 7 and 20 June 2019.

7 June: Khovd Vyestyern (Ховд Вестерн) 1 - 4 Khaan Khuns Titem (Хаан Хүнс Титэм)

8 June: INH (ИНХ) 0 - 14 Sumida (Сумида)

8 June: Tov Buganuud (Төв Буганууд) 5 - 2 Darkhan Shiluus (Дархан Шилүүс)

8 June: DMIU (ДМЮ) 1 - 5 SP Falcons (СП Фалконс)

9 June: Jipro (Жипро) 3 - 3 (5 - 4 p) Talyn Khokh Arslanguud (Талын Хөх Арслангууд)

9 June: Khanters (Хантерс) 2 - 1 UB-yn Mazaalainuud (УБ-ын Мазаалайнууд)

9 June: KHAD (ХАД) 0 - 10 FC BCH Lions (Би Си Эйч Лионс)

9 June: Mongol Temuulel (Монгол Тэмүүлэл) 12 - 1 Shonkhoruud (Шонхорууд)

10 June: Kharaatsai (Хараацай) 1 - 7 Khoromkhon (Хоромхон)

11 June: Khovd (Ховд) 5 - 1 Khuree Khovguud (Хүрээ Хөвгүүд)

12 June: Soyombyn Barsuud (Соёмбын Барсууд) 16 - 0 Oul FC (Оул Эф Си)

13 June: Khokh Chononuud (Хөх Чононууд) 1 - 7 Erchim (Эрчим)

17 June: Athletic 220 (Атлетик 220) 7-1 Dorno FC (Дорнод Эф Си)

18 June: Ulaanbaatar City (Улаанбаатар Сити) 14-0 Khan-Uul (Хан-Уул)

19 June: Anduud City (Андууд Сити) 1 - 3 Khangarid (Хангарьд)

20 June: Ulaanbaatar (Улаанбаатар) 1 - 3 Deren (Дэрэн)

Round of 16
The draw for the round of 16 was held on 21 June 2019.

Matches played between 3 and 7 July 2019.

3 July: Soyombyn Barsuud (Соёмбын Барсууд) 0 - 3 Khangarid (Хангарьд)

4 July: SP Falcons (СП Фалконс) 5 - 0 Khovd (Ховд)

5 July: Athletic 220 (Атлетик 220) 5 - 0 Jipro (Жипро)

6 July: Khanters (Хантерс) 0 - 2 FC BCH Lions (Би Си Эйч Лионс)

7 July: Sumida (Сумида) 0 - 11 Erchim (Эрчим)

7 July: Deren (Дэрэн) 8 - 0 Tov Buganuud (Төв Буганууд)

7 July: Khaan Khuns Titem (Хаан Хүнс Титэм) 3 - 4 Khoromkhon (Хоромхон)

7 July: Mongol Temuulel (Монгол Тэмүүлэл) 0 - 17 Ulaanbaatar City (Улаанбаатар Сити)

Quarter-finals
The draw for the quarter-finals onwards will be held on 19 July 2019.

First legs played between 30 and 31 July, second legs played between 6 and 8 August 2019.

30 July (1st leg): Athletic 220 (Атлетик 220) 3 - 2 Khoromkhon (Хоромхон)

31 July (1st leg): Deren (Дэрэн) 0 - 3 Erchim (Эрчим)

31 July (1st leg): Ulaanbaatar City (Улаанбаатар Сити) 3 - 5 Khangarid (Хангарьд)

31 July (1st leg): FC BCH Lions (Би Си Эйч Лионс) 0 - 2 SP Falcons (СП Фалконс)

6 August (2nd leg): Khangarid (Хангарьд) 3 - 2 Ulaanbaatar City (Улаанбаатар Сити) (agg 8 - 5)

7 August (2nd leg): SP Falcons (СП Фалконс) 3 - 1 FC BCH Lions (Би Си Эйч Лионс) (agg 5 - 1)

7 August (2nd leg): Khoromkhon (Хоромхон) 0 - 8 Athletic 220 (Атлетик 220) (agg 2 - 11)

8 August (2nd leg): Erchim (Эрчим) 0 - 2 Deren (Дэрэн) (agg 3 - 2)

Semi-finals
First legs played between 17 and 18 September, second legs played between 24 and 25 September 2019.

Final
Match played on 30 October 2019.

See also
2019 Mongolian Premier League

References

External links
Mongolian Football Federation

Football competitions in Mongolia
Mongolia
Cup